Johan "Joey" de Beer (born 1 June 1972) is a former professional tennis player from South Africa.

Biography
De Beer, a doubles specialist from Pretoria, was coached by Kobus Botha. He won a total of four Challenger doubles titles during his career.

In 1993 he reached the doubles final of the South African Open, an ATP Tour tournament in Durban, with Marcos Ondruska.

He appeared twice in the main draw of a Grand Slam event. He partnered Cristian Brandi at the 1993 US Open, for a first round exit, to 16th seeds Hendrik-Jan Davids and Piet Norval. At the 1994 Australian Open he made the second round with John-Laffnie de Jager. In the opening round, de Beer again faced the 16th seeds, but he and de Jager were victorious in straight sets, over Wayne Ferreira and Javier Sánchez. They lost an all South African second round match to Ellis Ferreira and Christo van Rensburg.

Early in the 1994 season he broke into the world's 100 ranked doubles players. It was also his final year on the circuit, he retired from tennis to complete a Physiotherapy degree at the University of Pretoria.

He was at one time coach of Wayne Ferreira and a trainer for Tim Henman.

Currently he works for the Lawn Tennis Association in England as a coach and physiotherapist. He was Andy Murray's physiotherapist when he won the Wimbledon title in 2013.

ATP Tour career finals

Doubles: 1 (0–1)

Challenger titles

Doubles: (4)

References

External links
 
 

1972 births
Living people
South African male tennis players
South African physiotherapists
Sportspeople from Pretoria
University of Pretoria alumni
South African tennis coaches
South African expatriate sportspeople in England